Caribbean Petroleum Corporation (CAPECO) is an oil company in Puerto Rico which owned an oil refinery in Bayamón having a capacity of . In addition, it operated more than 200 service stations in Puerto Rico under the Gulf brand name. On October 23, 2009, an explosion took place in the refinery destroying 11 storage tanks.

History
Caribbean Petroleum was incorporated in 1987 through the merger of Caribbean Gulf Refining Corp., Gulf Petroleum S.A., and Compañía Petrolera Chevron, Inc. The Bayamón refinery was originally built in 1955 to supply the Puerto Rico Electric Power Authority Palo Seco and San Juan Power Plant.

The refinery was shut down in April 1995 due to unprofitable margins. However, it reopened the next year.

Explosion

On October 23, 2009, one of the tanks in the refinery exploded due to a faulty gauge, leading to a massive fire that destroyed most of the facility. As a result, the company filed for bankruptcy.

References

External links
 Official  website

Oil companies of Puerto Rico